is a 1968 Japanese yakuza film directed by Yasuharu Hasebe.

Cast
 Akira Kobayashi as Jiro Sagae
 Jo Shishido as Hino
 Hideaki Nitani as Hakozaki
 Tamio Kawaji as Naruse
 Meiko Kaji (credited as Masako Ota) as Saeko Hayafune
 Tatsuya Fuji as Shinjo

Production
Retaliation was Hasebe's third film as a director. It was filmed in Marunouchi and Sakura, Chiba.

Release 
The film premiered on October 5, 1968. It was re-released in 2012 as part of the Kawasaki Shinyuri Film Festival on 8 October 2012. Arrow Video released the film 2015 first time on Blu-ray Disc and DVD.

Reception
Chris D., author of Outlaw Masters of Japanese Film described Retaliation as "a decent programmer" and that "staging is effective but occasionally it results in cluttered compositions that contribute to narrative confusion". The review concluded that 'Hasebe takes his story seriously, because the performances and realistically downbeat situations save the picture".

Sight & Sound compared the film to those of Seijun Suzuki who Hasebe had worked with previously as an assistant director. The review stated that Retaliation was "never be quite as visually or conceptually wild as Suzuki's, but they share something of the same breakneck cutting and tumultuous approach to staging action."

Notes

Sources

External links
 

Films directed by Yasuharu Hasebe
Nikkatsu films
Films shot in Tokyo
Yakuza films
1960s Japanese films